Luise Mühlbach was the pen name of Clara Mundt (née Clara Maria Regina Müller) (January 2, 1814 in Neubrandenburg – September 26, 1873 in Berlin), a German writer best known for her works of historical fiction, which enjoyed a wide, though short-lived popularity.  Frederick the Great and His Court and many of her other novels have been translated into English. 

She was born to Friedrich Andreas Müller and Friederika Müller (née Strübing) in Neubrandenburg.

Works
Her historical fiction includes:
Andreas Hofer
Berlin and Sans-Souci; or Frederick the Great and his friends 
A Conspiracy of the Carbonari 
The Daughter of an Empress 
Empress Josephine 
Frederick the Great and His Court 
Frederick the Great and His Family 
Goethe & Schiller, (English edition, 1902, P.F. Collier & Son)
Henry VIII and His Court 
Joseph II and His Court
Louisa of Prussia and Her Times
Marie Antoinette and Her Son
The Merchant of Berlin An Historical Novel
Mohammed Ali and His House
Napoleon and Blücher; or Napoleon in Germany
Napoleon and the Queen of Prussia
Old Fritz and the New Era 
Prince Eugene and His Times 
Queen Hortense: A Life Picture of the Napoleonic Era 
The Reign of the Great Elector
The Youth of the Great Elector
Franz Rákóczy

Family
She was married to the critic and novelist Theodor Mundt.

Notes

Cayzer, Herlinde (2007). Feminist Awakening: Ida von Hahn-Hahn’s “Gräfin Faustine” and Luise Mühlbach’s “Aphra Behn”. Univ. Diss. Univ. of Queensland, Brisbane. (Digitalisat: PDF; 2,1 MB)

References

External links
  
 
  
 

1814 births
1873 deaths
People from Neubrandenburg
German women novelists
German historical novelists
19th-century German women writers
19th-century German novelists